Marion Norbert-Riberolle (Troyes, January 7, 1999) is a French and after naturalization from 2021 a Belgian cyclist. She is mainly active in cyclo-cross. In 2020 she won gold at the French elite cyclo-cross championship. In the 2019-2020 season, she won gold at the U23 World championship and bronze at the U23 European championship. In 2022 and 2023 she won the silver medal at the Belgian elite cyclo-cross championship. She rides for the Belgian team Crelan-Fristads (cyclo-cross) and Fenix-Deceuninck (road).

Major results

Cyclo-cross
2019–2020
 1st  UCI World Under-23 Championships
 1st  French National Championships
 3rd  UEC European Under-23 Championships
2021–2022
 2nd Belgian National Championships
2022–2023
 1st Otegem
 2nd Belgian National Championships
 Exact Cross
2nd Zonnebeke
 3rd  Team relay, UCI World Championships

References

Living people
1999 births
Belgian female cyclists
Cyclo-cross cyclists
21st-century Belgian women